Bano or baño, alternatively spelled Banu is a Persian name  girls popular in Iran and other Persian-speaking countries. 

This may refer to the following:

People

Given name
 Bano Khalil Ahmed (born 1969), Pakistani politician
 Bano Haralu, Indian journalist and a conservationist
 Bano Qudsia (1928–2017), also known as Bano Aapa, Pakistani novelist, playwright and spiritualist
 Bano Traoré (born 1985), Malian athlete

Surname
 Arsénio Bano (born 1974), East Timorese politician
 Fatima Bano, Indian wrestling coach
 Franco Bano (born 1986), Argentinian footballer
 Ilir Bano, Albanian politician
 Iqbal Bano (1935–2009), Pakistani Ghazal singer
 Jeelani Bano (born 1936), Indian Urdu writer
 Khursheed Bano (1914–2001), Pakistani singer and actress
 Noor Bano (politician), Indian politician
 Saira Bano (born 1944), Indian actress
 Shah Bano (born  1916), Indian feminist
 Shamim Bano (1941–1984), Indian Pashtun actress

Other
 Albano Carrisi (born 1943), better known as Al Bano, Italian singer-songwriter, actor and winemaker

Arts and entertainment
 Bano (novel), by Pakistani novelist Razia Butt
 El baño, a 2005 Chilean film
 "El Baño", a 2018 song by Enrique Iglesias

Geography
 Bano block, a community development block of the Simdega district, Jharkhand, India
 Bano, Simdega, a village
 Bano railway station
 Monte Bano, a mountain in the province of Genoa, Italy

See also 
 Banos (disambiguation)
 Banu (disambiguation)
 Banneux, a village in the province of Liège, Belgium